The 1962 West Lothian by-election was a UK Parliamentary by-election held for the constituency of West Lothian in Scotland on 14 June 1962, following the death of sitting MP, John Taylor. The by-election saw the election of Tam Dalyell, who went on to become a long-standing and controversial MP. Additionally, the Scottish National Party had a surprisingly strong showing—their candidate, William Wolfe, became the party leader for several years.

Candidates from the Liberal and Conservative parties both lost their deposits. It was the first deposit lost by the Conservatives in Scotland since 1920.

Election

References 

Politics of West Lothian
1962 elections in the United Kingdom
By-elections to the Parliament of the United Kingdom in Scottish constituencies
1962 in Scotland
1960s elections in Scotland